Folketing elections were held alongside Landsting elections in Denmark on 30 October 1945, except in the Faroe Islands where they were held on 20 November. The Social Democratic Party remained the largest in the Folketing, with 48 of the 149 seats. Voter turnout was 86% in Denmark proper and 57% in the Faroes.

Results

References

Elections in Denmark
Denmark
1945 elections in Denmark
October 1945 events in Europe